The Battle of Skornishchevo was a battle fought between the Grand Principality of Moscow and the Grand Principality of Ryazan on the 14th of December 1371. The battle took place near Pereyaslavl Ryazansky on the site, which was called Skornishchevo. The Muscovites won the battle forcing Oleg Ivanovich to flee, and not return to his rule for six months.

Background 
After the death of the Grand Prince of Moscow Ivan II Ivanovich of Moscow, a lingering dispute between the Grand Principality of Moscow and the Grand Principality of Ryazan resurfaced. It was mainly generated by the new Grand Prince of Moscow Dmitri Ivanovich Donskoy's relations with Tver and Lithuania. 
Although, in 1370, troops from Ryazan and Principality of Pronsk went to help the Muscovites against Algirdas, the following year, an open war began between Moscow and Grand Principality of Ryazan. On 14 December 1371 Dmitri Ivanovich Donskoy, Grand Prince of Moscow, sent his troops to Ryazan under the command of Dmitri Mikhailovich Bobrok of Volhynia. The Grand Prince of Ryazan Oleg Ivanovich assembled his squad, and cheerfully took to the battle.

The battle 

The Ryazanians already forgotten the failures of the previous wars with the Muscovites. The first 20 years of Oleg Ivanovich of Ryazan's reign awakened in them the consciousness of their own strengths, and they had previously discovered the certainty of victory. This confidence gave was met by northern chroniclers with contempt.

"Ryazanians, fierce and proud people, were so uplifted in their mind, that they began to talk to each other insanely: do not take armor and weapons with you, but take only belts and ropes with which to tie up the timid and weak Muscovites. The latter on the contrary walked with humility and sighing, calling on God to help. And the Lord, seeing their humility, raised the Muscovites, and the pride of the Ryazans was humiliated. " 

The battle took place near Pereyaslavl Ryazansky on the site, which was called Skornishchevo. The Moscow troops were under the command of Dmitri Mikhailovich Bobrok, one of the most talented military commanders of the era. The Ryazan troops were under the command of Oleg Ivanovich who was extremely confident but did not have the experience of his counterpart. The Chronicle of the battle indicates that Dmitri Bobrok used in his favor the excessive arrogance of his enemies.

"The Ryazanians waved belt loops in vain, the chronicler continues; They fell like sheaves and were killed like pigs. So the Lord helped Grand Prince Dmitri Ivanovich and his soldiers: they defeated the forces of Ryazan, and their prince, Oleg Ivanovich, barely escaped with a small group of followers." 

Belt and rope loops, which are mentioned in the chronicle, were probably nothing else than lassos, first used by the Ryazanians in the battle of Skornishchevo, but which were currently used by the Tartars in the steppes. No doubt, these lassos deceived the chronicler, who attributed to the Ryazanians such a frivolity, that they did not want to take weapons with them.

Consequences 
Oleg Ivanovich fled. The rule of Pereyaslavl Ryazan was taken by Vladimir Yaroslavovich Pronsky. (Six months later, Oleg Ivanovich returned to the capital with the help of the Tartar Murza.)

References 
Иловайский Д. История рязанского княжества. Moscow, 1858. page 162

Conflicts in 1371
Skornishchevo
1371 in Europe
14th century in Russia
14th century in the Grand Duchy of Moscow